John Keith McBroom Laird (12 January 1907 – 12 November 1985) was a Canadian author, barrister, and solicitor. He was a member of the Canadian Liberal Party, a well-known tax lawyer in Windsor, and a law partner of Paul Martin, Sr., who was the father of Prime Minister Paul Martin.

He served as Senator for Windsor, Ontario in the Federal Parliament from 6 April 1967 until 12 January 1982.

Personal life
Laird was born in Blenheim, Ontario, Canada.

Political relatives
Sir Alexander Stevenson (1860–1936) Edinburgh Lord Provost - 1st cousin, twice removed
Lord James Stevenson (1873–1926) Member of House of Lords - 2nd cousin, once removed
Stewart Stevenson (born 1946) Member of the Scottish Parliament - 3rd cousin

External links
 

1907 births
1985 deaths
Canadian senators from Ontario
Lawyers in Ontario
Liberal Party of Canada senators
People from Chatham-Kent
20th-century Canadian lawyers